The 2019 Trail World Championships was the ninth edition of the global trail running competition, organised by the International Association of Ultrarunners (IAU) and International Trail Running Association (ITRA). It was held on 8 June 2019 in Miranda do Corvo, Portugal. The event was hosted by the annual Ultra Trilhos dos Abutres (Vultures Trail) and featured a course of 44 km in distance with uphills totalling 2120 m and downhills totalling 1970 m. The men's individual race was won by Great Britain's Jonathan Albon and the women's individual race was won by France's Blandine L'Hirondel. France won both the men's and women's team rankings.

Results

Men

Women

References

External links
 Official web site of IAU (governing body for ultra running)
 Official web site of ITRA (governing body for trail running)

2019
Trial World Championships
Trial World Championships
Sport in Coimbra District
Miranda do Corvo